State Route 322 (SR 322) is an east–west state highway in East Tennessee, connecting Paint Rock with Vonore via Sweetwater. It serves as an alternate route for SR 72, bypassing Loudon.

Route description

SR 322 begins in Roane County in Paint Rock at an intersection with SR 72. It goes southeast as Sweetwater Road and traverses some ridges and valleys before curving east to enter farmland and shortly passing through the southernmost part of Loudon County. SR 322 then crosses in Monroe County as Oakland Road to enter Sweetwater at an interchange with I-75 (Exit 62). It continues east to bypass downtown to the north and have an intersection with US 11/SR 2. The highway then leaves Sweetwater and continues east through farmland as Sweetwater Vonore Road. SR 322 then makes a sharp right at an intersection with Loudon Road before crossing over a ridge and coming to an end at another intersection with SR 72 at the northwest corner of Vonore.

Major intersections

References

322
Transportation in Roane County, Tennessee
Transportation in Loudon County, Tennessee
Transportation in Monroe County, Tennessee